Luigi De Filippo (10 August 1930 – 31 March 2018) was an Italian actor, stage director and playwright.

Born in Naples, the son of actors Peppino De Filippo and Adele Carloni, he studied literature at the university, leaving the studies on the threshold of graduation to pursue a career in journalism. Shorty later De Filippo debuted on stage next to his father, and from then he started a very long acting career, notably running for years a Neapolitan dialect company. He celebrated the fortieth anniversary of his stage activities with the reception of a special Premio Personalità Europea prize in Capitol Hill. 

De Filippo appeared in many film roles, even if mainly in character roles. He was also active on television, mainly in television adaptations of his stage works. Since 2011 he has been the artistic director of the Parioli Theatre in Rome. De Filippo died in Rome on 31 March 2018 at the age of 87.

Partial filmography

 Filumena Marturano (1951) - Umberto
 Non è vero... ma ci credo (1952) - Ragionier Pietro Spirito
 The Legend of the Piave (1952) - Giorgio, un soldato
 Peppino e la vecchia signora (1954)
 Cortile (1955) - Garage Attendant
 Da qui all'eredità (1955) - Pretendente di Marisa
 Lazzarella (1957) - Nicola Sant'Elmo
 Anna of Brooklyn (1958) - Zitto-Zitto
 Promesse di marinaio (1958) - Quattrocchi
 Policarpo (1959) - Gerolamo 'Gegè' Pancarano di Rondò
 You're on Your Own (1959) - Commilitone di Nicola
 Roulotte e roulette (1959) - Paolo
 Cerasella (1959) - Alfredo
 Il mio amico Jekyll (1960)
 Who Hesitates Is Lost (1960) - Cavallo
 Gli incensurati (1961)
 The Four Days of Naples (1962) - Cicillo (uncredited)
 Il mio amico Benito (1962) - Fioretti
 Honeymoon, Italian Style (1966) - Camilluccio
 Love Italian Style (1966) - Ricuzzo - Don Salvatore's Secretary
 Soldati e capelloni (1967) - Mosca
 Ninì Tirabusciò: la donna che inventò la mossa (1970) - Ciccio / Mohamed Ali
 Venga a fare il soldato da noi (1971) - Pasquale Gagliardelli
 Giovanni Senzapensieri (1986) - Achille / Segretario del Duca
 Quelli del casco (1988)
 In the Name of the Sovereign People (1990)

References

External links 

1930 births
2018 deaths
Theatre people from Naples
Italian male stage actors
Italian male film actors
Italian male television actors
Italian theatre directors
Italian dramatists and playwrights